Köfering is a municipality in the district of Regensburg in Bavaria in Germany.

Notable people
Philipp Graf Lerchenfeld (1952–2017), politician (CSU)

References

Regensburg (district)